is a Japanese manga series written and illustrated by Aho Toro. The manga was serialized in Kodansha's Monthly Shōnen Sirius magazine from September 2017 to July 2018, before being transferred to Magazine Pocket manga app in August 2018 and finished in February 2021. The manga is licensed in North America by Kodansha USA. An anime television series adaptation by Platinum Vision aired from January to March 2021.

Characters

Media

Manga
Dr. Ramune: Mysterious Disease Specialist is written and illustrated by Aho Toro. The manga was serialized in Kodansha's Monthly Shōnen Sirius from September 26, 2017, to July 26, 2018. The series was then transferred to Kodansha's Magazine Pocket manga app on August 31, 2018. It finished on February 22, 2021. Kodansha collected its chapters in five tankōbon volumes, released from April 9, 2018, to March 9, 2021.

In North America, Kodansha USA announced the digital English release of the manga in October 2020. The first volume was released on November 17, 2020.

Volume list

Anime
In September 2020, it was announced that the series would receive an anime television series adaptation. The series is produced by Platinum Vision and directed by Hideaki Ōba. Ayumu Hisao is in charge of the series' scripts and Youko Satou is in charge of the characters designs. Tetsurō Oda is composing the series' music. The series aired from January 10 to March 28, 2021, on Tokyo MX and BS11. Crunchyroll is streaming the series outside of Asia. Muse Communication licensed the series in Southeast Asia and South Asia and is streaming it on their Muse Asia YouTube channel. The opening theme song is "SHAKE！SHAKE！SHAKE！" performed by Yūma Uchida, while the ending theme song is  performed by saji.

Episode list

Notes

References

External links
 
 

2021 anime television series debuts
Anime series based on manga
Comedy anime and manga
Crunchyroll anime
Crunchyroll Originals
Fantasy anime and manga
Kodansha manga
Muse Communication
Platinum Vision
Shōnen manga
Tokyo MX original programming